New Yorker, legally New Yorker Group Services International GmbH & Co.KG, is a German clothing retailer headquartered in Braunschweig.

In 1971 the first New Yorker store was opened in Flensburg. In December 2006, the company won the first billion in sales. By November 2022, the company owned 1,150 branches in 47 countries: Albania, Armenia, Azerbaijan, Austria, Belarus, Belgium, Bosnia and Herzegovina, Bulgaria, Croatia, Czech Republic, Denmark, Egypt, Estonia, Finland, France, Georgia, Germany, Hungary, Iceland, Italy, Kazakhstan, Kosovo, Latvia, Lithuania, Luxembourg, Macedonia, Moldova, Montenegro, Morocco, Netherlands, Norway, Poland, Portugal, Qatar, Romania, Russia, Saudi Arabia, Serbia, Slovakia, Slovenia, Spain, Sweden, Switzerland, Ukraine and the United Arab Emirates.

In March 2012 Olly Murs became the face for New Yorker's men spring/summer range and customers were able to get their photos taken with a cardboard cut-out of Murs.

The company has over 23,000 employees. New Yorker is naming sponsor of the Braunschweig-based German Football League team New Yorker Lions and formerly also the Basketball Bundesliga team New Yorker Phantoms Braunschweig (now Basketball Löwen Braunschweig). The company also sponsors the international b-boy competition Battle of the Year.

History 
It all began in 1971, when Tilmar Hansen and Michael Simson opened the first New Yorker branch in downtown Flensburg, which at the time was just a simple jeans shop. A little later, the current managing director Friedrich Knapp, who also managed a denim store in Braunschweig at the time, joined the company. The three eventually founded SHK-Jeans GmbH and opened their first branches throughout Germany in the 1970s and 1980s. In 1990, Simson left the company and was only associated as the owner of a few properties in which New Yorker branches were located. In 1994, the first step across the German border was made. At that time, the two entrepreneurs opened the first foreign branch in Linz, Austria. Once abroad, the company continued to expand rapidly. Beginning in 1998 with the addition of stores in Czechia and Poland, as of 2022 the chain spans almost 50 countries and 3 continents.

Criticism 
In February 2015, the company was accused of attempting to prevent the establishment of works councils. Frankfurter Rundschau reported that after a works council was established at a store in Offenbach am Main, the company spun off that location into a separate subsidiary, which was subsequently liquidated.

In November 2017, the Süddeutsche Zeitung reported that Friedrich Knapp, the sole owner of New Yorker, appeared in the Paradise Papers. The newspaper described email correspondence about establishing a Cayman Islands-based aircraft leasing company, which, "for German tax reasons", would hold and lease the company's jets.

Stores

External links

Official Site

See also

 Foreign branding

References

Clothing retailers of Germany
2000s fashion
Retail companies established in 1971
Clothing brands of Germany
Companies based in Braunschweig
1971 establishments in West Germany
German companies established in 1971